Aigues-Juntes is a commune in the Ariège department in southwestern France.

Geography
The Lèze, tributary of the Ariège, forms part of the commune's southwestern and northwestern borders.

Politics and administration

Population

Inhabitants of Aigues-Juntes are called Aigues-Juntais.

Local culture and patrimony 

 Lac de Mondély, located across three communes: Aigues-Juntes, La Bastide-de-Sérou and Gabre.

See also
Communes of the Ariège department

References

Communes of Ariège (department)